The following radio stations broadcast on FM frequency 102.1 MHz:

Argentina
 LRI315 in Santa Fe, Santa Fe
 LRI854 Vorterix Rock in Rosario, Santa Fe
 Radio María in San Pedro, Buenos Aires
 Radio María in Paraná, Entre Ríos
 Radio María in Salta
 Radio María in Santa Fe

Australia
 4ZZZ in Brisbane, Queensland
 8CCC in Alice Springs and Tennant Creek, Northern Territory
 ABC Classic FM in Longreach, Queensland
 3MIL in Swan Hill, Victoria
 CAAMA in Yulara, Northern Territory
 3NNN in Wangaratta, Victoria
 SBS Radio in Moree, New South Wales
 Triple J in Broken Hill, New South Wales
 Triple J in Newcastle, New South Wales

Brazil
 ZYD 604 in Rio Grande, Rio Grande do Sul

Canada (Channel 271)
 CBGA-FM in Matane, Quebec
 CBJ-FM-6 in La Baie, Quebec
 CBOF-FM-7 in Brockville, Ontario
 CBR-FM in Calgary, Alberta
 CBUF-FM-1 in Chilliwack, British Columbia
 CBUR-FM in Houston, British Columbia
 CFCJ-FM in Cochrane, Ontario
 CFEL-FM in Levis, Quebec
 CFNY-FM in Brampton, Ontario
 CFSI-FM-1 in Saltspring Island, British Columbia
 CFWY-FM in Whitehorse, Yukon
 CHPR-FM in Hawkesbury, Ontario
 CISW-FM in Whistler, British Columbia
 CJCY-FM in Medicine Hat, Alberta
 CJDJ-FM in Saskatoon, Saskatchewan
 CJGO-FM in La Sarre, Quebec
 CJRW-FM in Summerside, Prince Edward Island
 CJTK-FM-2 in Little Current, Ontario
 CKHL-FM in High Level, Alberta
 CKXR-FM-1 in Sorrento, British Columbia
 CKXR-FM-3 in Sicamous, British Columbia
 VF2291 in Carol Lake Mining, Newfoundland and Labrador
 VF2537 in Fruitvale, British Columbia
 VOAR-5-FM in Deer Lake, Newfoundland and Labrador

India
 FM Rainbow in Trichy, Tamil Nadu

Malaysia
 Buletin FM in Seremban, Negeri Sembilan (Coming Soon)
 Raaga in Taiping, Perak
 Sinar in Kuching, Sarawak

Mexico
 XHAG-FM in Córdoba, Veracruz
 XHECPQ-FM in Felipe Carrillo Puerto, Quintana Roo
 XHEPS-FM in Guaymas, Sonora
 XHESL-FM in San Luis Potosí, San Luis Potosí
 XHJK-FM in Ciudad Delicias, Chihuahua
 XHOMA-FM in Comala, Colima
 XHPECW-FM in Actopan, Hidalgo
 XHPIC-FM in Pichucalco, Chiapas
 XHSCCW-FM in San Antonio de la Cal, Oaxaca
 XHSCDF-FM in 20 de Noviembre, Emiliano Zapata Municipality, Chiapas
 XHQI-FM in Monterrey, Nuevo León
 XHTOM-FM in Toluca, Estado de México
 XHURM-FM in Uruapan, Michoacán
 XHVC-FM in Puebla, Puebla
 XHVFC-FM in Otumba, Estado de México
 XHYO-FM in Huatabampo, Sonora

United Kingdom
 Swansea Bay Radio in Swansea, Wales

United States (Channel 271)
  in Prescott, Arizona
 KBDY in Hanna, Wyoming
 KBMC (FM) in Bozeman, Montana
  in Raymondville, Texas
  in Roseau, Minnesota
  in Los Molinos, California
 KCKC in Kansas City, Missouri
 KDGE in Fort Worth-Dallas, Texas
  in Blanchard, Louisiana
  in Saint Paul, Minnesota
 KEGB-LP in Bend, Oregon
  in Tahlequah, Oklahoma
 KFIM-LP in Carroll, Iowa
  in Oro Valley, Arizona
 KFZX in Gardendale, Texas
 KGRE-FM in Estes Park, Colorado
 KHBE in Big Wells, Texas
 KHKC-FM in Atoka, Oklahoma
 KILX in De Queen, Arkansas
 KJAS-LP in Ames, Iowa
  in Louisiana, Missouri
 KLVJ in Encinitas, California
 KMJQ in Houston, Texas
 KODC-LP in Dodge City, Kansas
 KOKY in Sherwood, Arkansas
  in Wenatchee, Washington
 KPRR in El Paso, Texas
 KQMY in Paia, Hawaii
  in Brookline, Missouri
 KQUQ-LP in Albuquerque, New Mexico
 KRBQ in San Francisco, California
 KRKC-FM in King City, California
  in Reno, Nevada
  in Breckenridge, Colorado
 KSSI in China Lake, California
 KSTI in Port Angeles, Washington
 KSWW in Ocean Shores, Washington
 KTMB in Anchorage, Alaska
  in Farmington, New Mexico
 KTUI-FM in Sullivan, Missouri
 KUDO-LP in Harrison, Arkansas
  in Milford, Iowa
 KWFO-FM in Driggs, Idaho
 KXSU-LP in Seattle, Washington
 KXWS-LP in Watsonville, California
  in Basile, Louisiana
 KYRN in Socorro, New Mexico
 KYUN in Twin Falls, Idaho
 KZLJ-LP in La Junta, Colorado
 KZLU-LP in Baton Rouge, Louisiana
  in McCook, Nebraska
 KZSN in Hutchinson, Kansas
  in Oglesby, Illinois
  in Meridian, Mississippi
  in Springfield, Massachusetts
  in Waverly, New York
 WCPP-LP in Ironwood, Michigan
 WCRM-LP in Columbus, Ohio
  in Jeffersonville, New York
  in Danville, Illinois
 WDOK in Cleveland, Ohio
  in Decatur, Alabama
 WFAH-LP in Flint, Michigan
 WGAF-LP in Fayetteville, Georgia
  in Crawford, Georgia
 WHJU-LP in Conyers, Georgia
  in Mount Vernon, Illinois
  in Du Bois, Pennsylvania
  in Lima, Ohio
 WIOQ in Philadelphia, Pennsylvania
 WIQQ in Leland, Mississippi
 WIVI in Cruz Bay, Virgin Islands
  in Albion, New York
 WJMH in Reidsville, North Carolina
 WJST in Sylvester, Georgia
 WKFF in Sardis, Mississippi
  in Rock Harbor, Florida
 WKOT-LP in Wimauma, Florida
 WKVZ in Dexter, Maine
  in Lawrenceburg, Kentucky
 WKZV in Tybee Island, Georgia
 WLCT in Lafayette, Tennessee
  in Bad Axe, Michigan
  in Beattyville, Kentucky
  in Mayfield, Kentucky
  in Milwaukee, Wisconsin
 WMJS-LP in Prince Frederick, Maryland
 WMUK in Kalamazoo, Michigan
  in Pamplico, South Carolina
 WNGK-LP in Fort Lauderdale, Florida
 WOPC-LP in Bradenton, Florida
 WPBW-LP in St. Petersburg, Florida
  in Watertown, Florida
  in Lena, Illinois
  in Citronelle, Alabama
 WRGR in Tupper Lake, New York
  in Forestville, Wisconsin
  in Monticello, Mississippi
  in Marietta, Ohio
  in Richmond, Virginia
  in Hampton, New Hampshire
 WVFC-LP in Stephenson, Michigan
 WVXR in Randolph, Vermont
  in Santa Rosa Beach, Florida
 WWFH-LP in Land O' Lakes, Florida
  in Sevierville, Tennessee
  in Bolingbroke, Georgia
 WXJR-LP in Talking Rock, Georgia
  in Virginia Beach, Virginia
 WZUN-FM in Phoenix, New York

References

Lists of radio stations by frequency